Raslakite is a rare mineral of the eudialyte group with the chemical formula . This formula is based on the original one, and is extended to show the presence of cyclic silicate groups. The additional silicon and oxygen shown in separation from the cyclic groups (in parentheses) are in fact connected with two 9-fold rings.  The mineral has lowered symmetry (space group R3, instead of more specific for the group R3m one), similarly to some other eudialyte-group members: aqualite, labyrinthite, oneillite and voronkovite. The specific feature of raslakite is, among others, the presence of sodium and zirconium at the M2 site. Raslakite was named after Raslak Cirques located nearby the type locality.

Occurrence and association
Raslakite was discovered, together with ikranite, in peralkaline pegmatites of the Mt. Karnasurt, Lovozero massif, Kola Peninsula, Russia. Raslakite is associated with aegirine, fluorcaphite, kazakovite, lamprophyllite, microcline, nepheline, and terskite.

Notes on chemistry
Beside main elements given in the formula, raslakite contains some potassium, strontium, manganese, magnesium, cerium, titanium, and aluminium, with minor amounts of lanthanum and hafnium.

Notes on crystal structure
The M(1) site in raslakite is split into two sub-sites, where Fe and Ca are located. The M(2) site is occupied by sodium, manganese (both with coordination number 5), and zirconium (tetrahedral coordination).

References

Cyclosilicates
Sodium minerals
Calcium minerals
Iron minerals
Zirconium minerals
Niobium minerals
Trigonal minerals
Minerals in space group 146
Minerals described in 2002